Implementation fidelity (also called implementation integrity or treatment fidelity) is a concept in program evaluation determining the extent to which anyone using a research design was actually able to follow the methodology.

A project with high fidelity is performed as designed.

References

Further consideration
Measuring Implementation Fidelity, 2009
Implementation fidelity, 2015
Working with Practitioners to Develop Measures of Implementation Fidelity, 2018
Impact assessment